Raithel is a surname that may refer to:

Franz Raithel (1905–1936), German soldier and skier, competitor in the 1928 Winter Olympics (military patrol); brother of Helmuth Raithel
Helmuth Raithel (1907–1990), German Waffen-SS officer
Hugo Raithel (1932–2020), German composer, conductor and pianist
Johann Raithel (1897–1961), German Luftwaffe officer

Frida Richard née Friederike Raithel (1873–1946), Austrian actress

Surnames
German-language surnames